Central Stadium was a stadium with a capacity of 120,000 in Leipzig which was initially used for matches of SC Rotation Leipzig. 

About 1.5 million cubic metres of debris from the World War II bombing of Leipzig was used in the stadium's construction. Its name derives from the Soviet "Central Stadium".

Background
After the 1896 Summer Olympics, the city of Leipzig began to plan a stadium. The Zentralstadion was built first for the sports students in the Sportforum Leipzig, with a capacity of 100,000. Next to it was an Olympic-style swimming stadium. After the sports university, rowing channel and the swimming stadium were established, plans were made for a new stadium downtown; Leipzig wanted to be awarded the Olympic Games. Blueprints by architect Werner March, the architect of Berlin's Olympiastadion, were used. Finishing the plan took 15 months, with 180,000 volunteers. Walter Ulbricht called the stadium "Stadion der Hunderttausend" (Stadium of 100,000), and made it the home of the German Gym and Sports Celebrations.

Construction

Part of Sports Forum Leipzig 

After the War of the Fourth Coalition, educators Ernst Moritz Arndt and Friedrich Ludwig Jahn wanted German national sports celebrations to train the Lützow Free Corps to defend against the French. Leipzig became one of the wealthiest cities in Germany, with a number of sports festivals; the only larger sports gathering was the 1936 Summer Olympics. Leader Walter Ulbricht wanted a national-class stadium to commemorate the 100,000 fallen soldiers in the Battle of Leipzig.

Free German Youth regional leader Heinz Haferkorn was tasked with finding 200 volunteers per day, and work on the stadium began on August 2, 1955. To save money, debris from the 1945 bombings was used. Its architect of record was Karl Souradny, who only completed the ground drawings and never visited the site. A total of 180,000 volunteers worked for 735,992 hours on the stadium, which cost M28 million (DM5.6 million). A small train brought debris to the stadium, which was mixed with ash, soil and water and compressed into bricks.

Replacement 
In 1990, due to riots in other European countries and in Leipzig's Alfred-Kunze-Sportpark, access to Zentralstadion was banned to reduce further rioting. The bell in the stadium's Werner Seelenbinder Tower was silenced.

Due to the rising maintenance costs, the city decided to build a smaller, soccer-only stadium in 1997. 
According to critics, Berlin's similar-size Olympiastadion was renovated at the same time and the Zentralstadion could have been saved. Germany won the right to host the 2006 Fifa World Cup in 2000, prompting renovation of many German soccer-specific stadiums (including the Olympiastadion).

Gallery

International Soccer Matches of the East Germany national football team

Between 1957 and 2004, all matches were broadcast by the Deutscher Fernsehfunk and later Eurosport. 2,812,000 visitors came to the matches in all. The Soviet Union was the team with the most matches as foreign team here.  The average of the visitor numbers is 63,909 without club team matches, Spartakiade and the East German Sports Festival. The East Germany national team won 20 matches with 13 drawns and 10 defeats. One match was hosted  as national stadium for Poland. 21 matches took place as qualifying matches. 23 matches were exhibition matches.

German Sports Festival (National Olympics for East Germans) 

During this festival came at least 150,000. 
1956 (2.–5. August): II. Deutsches Turn- und Sportfest
1959 (13.–16. August): III. Deutsches Turn- und Sportfest
1963 (1.–4. August): IV. Deutsches Turn- und Sportfest
1969 (24.–27. July): V. Turn- und Sportfest der DDR
1977 (25.–31. July): VI. Turn- und Sportfest der DDR und VI. Kinder- und Jugendspartakiade
1983 (25.–31. July): VII. Turn- und Sportfest der DDR und IX. Kinder- und Jugendspartakiade
1987 (27. July–2. August): VIII. Turn- und Sportfest der DDR und XI. Kinder- und Jugendspartakiade

Notes
 Video documentation: "Täve, Trümmer und Triumphe" | 23.09.2014 | 29:55 Min. | Broadcaster: Mitteldeutscher Rundfunk"

Further reading

External links

 "Discover the history of the Zentralstadion"
 Computer Aided Design Animation

See also
 Rungrado 1st of May Stadium
 Strahov Stadium
 Estadio Azteca

References

Buildings and structures in Leipzig
Football venues in East Germany
History of sport in East Germany
Sports venues in Saxony
Sports venues completed in 1956
1. FC Lokomotive Leipzig
Sport in Leipzig
Football venues in Germany